6C or VI-C may refer to :

 Sixth Cambridge Survey of radio sources
 Alfa Romeo 6C, a road, race and sports car
 Keratin 6C in biochemistry
 Stalag VI-C, a German prisoner of war camp
 Carbon (6C), a chemical element
 6C, the production code for the 1982 Doctor Who serial Time-Flight

See also
C6 (disambiguation)